King Xiang of Qi (died 265 BC) was from 283 to 265 BC king of Qi, one of the seven major states of the Warring States period of ancient China.  King Xiang's personal name was Tian Fazhang (田法章), ancestral name Gui (媯), and King Xiang was his posthumous title.

At the time of King Min of Qi, the kingdom was invaded and the king himself was captured and killed in 284 BC. His son, Fazhang, fled, changing his name, and "became a servant in the home of the Grand Astrologer." There, the astrologer's daughter met and fell in love with him. Later, some of the loyal officers of Qi put Fazhang on the throne, and he made the astrologer's daughter, his queen; she was the mother of his successor. She is known as Queen Jun and was said to be a wise and honorable woman who helped run the affairs of state. However, her father, Ji, was angry that she had married without his consent and refused to see his daughter ever again.

King Xiang reigned for 19 years and died in 265 BC. He was succeeded by his son, King Jian of Qi.

Family
Queens:
 Queen Jun, of the Hou clan of Qi (君後 後姓; d. 249 BC), a daughter of Taishi Jiao (太史敫); the mother of Prince Jian

Sons:
 Prince Jian (公子建; 280–221 BC), ruled as the King of Qi from 264–221 BC
 Prince Jia (公子假; 275–205 BC)

Ancestry

References

Monarchs of Qi (state)
3rd-century BC Chinese monarchs
Chinese kings
265 BC deaths
Year of birth unknown